Eucithara conohelicoides is a small sea snail, a marine gastropod mollusk in the family Mangeliidae.

Description
The length of the shell attains 13 mm.

The shell is longitudinally many ridged, transversely striate. Its color is yellowish white, with sometimes a large orange-brown blotch on the back of the body-whorl.

Distribution
This marine species occurs off the Philippines and off Queensland, Australia.

References

  Reeve, L.A. 1846. Monograph of the genus Mangelia. pls 1-8 in Reeve, L.A. (ed). Conchologia Iconica. London : L. Reeve & Co. Vol. 3.
 Souverbie, M. (1875) Descriptions d’espèces nouvelles de l’Archipel Calédonien. Journal de Conchyliologie, 23, 282–296. page(s): 286, pl. 13 fig. 4
 Cernohorsky, W.O. 1978. Tropical Pacific Marine Shells. Sydney : Pacific Publications 352 pp., 68 pls.

External links
  Tucker, J.K. 2004 Catalog of recent and fossil turrids (Mollusca: Gastropoda). Zootaxa 682:1-1295.
 
 MNHN, Paris: Eucithara conohelicoides

conohelicoides
Gastropods described in 1846